The 1996 ITC Hockenheim-2 round was the eleventh round of the 1996 International Touring Car Championship season. It took place on 13 October at the Hockenheimring.

Klaus Ludwig won the first race, starting from pole position, and Manuel Reuter gained the second one, both driving an Opel Calibra V6 4x4.

Classification

Qualifying

Race 1

Notes:
 – Masanori Sekiya was given a 10-second penalty for cutting the track.

Race 2

Standings after the event

Drivers' Championship standings

Manufacturers' Championship standings

 Note: Only the top five positions are included for both sets of drivers' standings.

References

External links
Deutsche Tourenwagen Masters official website

1996 International Touring Car Championship season